The Gleaner Life Insurance Society, originally the Ancient Order of Gleaners, is a fraternal benefit society based in Adrian, Michigan.

History 

The Ancient Order of Gleaners was formed in 1894 in Caro, Michigan by Grant Slocum. Articles of incorporation were drawn up by attorney Walter Gamble and submitted to the Michigan Insurance Commissioner on September 2, 1894 and a charter was granted September 25. The Gleaners were the first fraternal society incorporated under Act 119, a law regulating insurance passed by the Michigan legislature that year. At the time the group had 220 members. A newspaper man himself, Slocum published the group's first four-page newsletter that eventually became The Gleaner, a "large and influential farm journal".

Organization 

The Gleaners worked on a two tier organizational modal - local lodges, known as "Arbors". Each Arbor had a set of officers - Chief Gleaner, Vice-Chief Gleaner, Secretary, Treasurer Chaplain, Conductor, Conductress Lecturer and Guard.  The last five officers had ritual duties. There were 98 active Arbors in 1979.  The national structure was called the "Supreme Arbor", which met biennially. The headquarters were in Birmingham, Michigan, as of 1979. In 1981, Gleaner's headquarters moved to Adrian, Michigan, where it remains today.

Membership 

Originally the society was limited to farmers, gardeners and people engaged in related activities who lived in town of less than 3,000 people. By the 1970s membership was open to  all persons of good moral character, over the age of sixteen  who believe in a  "Supreme Being, the Creator and Preserver of the Universe". Members were voted on by blackball ballot, with two blackballs sufficient for rejection. There were three categories of membership - Junior, Beneficiary and Cooperative. Cooperative members joined the organization, but without insurance benefits. Juniors were insured from birth to age fifteen and became Beneficiary members after they turned twenty one.

In 1969 the Gleaners had 55,000 members. By 1979 this had declined to 47,000 members. The Gleaners had 43,000 members in 1994. As of 2013, the group claims 74,000 members.

Ritual 
The Gleaners had a ritual that worked four degrees - Initiatory,  Adoption, Ruth, and Dramatic. The Initiatory degree was required of all members. The names, rituals and ceremonies of the three degrees were based on the Biblical Book of Ruth. The  rituals also included prayers and hymns, but omitted any explicit references to Christianity or Jesus Christ.

Benefits and activities 
In addition to its insurance benefits the Gleaners sponsor scholarships and volunteers at the Arbor level. Recreational activities include baseball, bowling, square dancing and picnics.

References

External links 
Official Homepage

Financial services companies established in 1894
Fraternal orders
Organizations established in 1894
Organizations based in Michigan